Yaqshid District is a district in the southeastern Banaadir region of Somalia.
One of the largest districts in the region, it consists Xaafada Sooq Bacaad, Juungal, Carafaad, Xaafada Towfiiq, Siinaay, Fagax, Mahad Alla, Suuqa Xoolaha, Gubta, Tawakal and Jaamacada Muqdishu. The Abgaal subclan of Hawiye are well represented.

References

Districts of Somalia
Administrative map of Yaqshid District

Districts of Somalia
Banaadir